Spirit River Airport  is located adjacent to Spirit River, Alberta, Canada.

References

Registered aerodromes in Alberta